William Lacon (ca. 1540 – before 1609), of Willey, Shropshire, was an English politician.

Lacon was a Member of Parliament for Much Wenlock in 1571 and 1597.

References

1540 births
Year of death missing
Politicians from Shropshire
English MPs 1571
English MPs 1597–1598